Walter Meego was an American band from Chicago, Illinois. The bandmembers now live in Los Angeles, California.

History 
Walter Meego was formed in 2004 by Justin Sconza (guitar, keyboards and vocals), Pat Pellegrini, and Colin Yarck (production) in the basement of Pellegrini's house. Patrick Pellegrini left the band in 2005, and Andrew Adzemovic (guitar and vocals) joined the band in 2017. They released a series of EPs before their debut album, "Voyager" was released in May 2008. The band's second full-length LP "Wondervalley" was released in November 2010 as a free download on the band's website and as a paid download on iTunes.

Several of the band's songs have been featured on TV shows and advertisements, including ABC's Ugly Betty and the Heineken Beertender ads which aired in the spring and summer of 2008. Additionally, Justin Sconza's solo song, "Pretty Picture," was featured in the Cox Communications ad "Pod," starting in the summer of 2008. The spot was produced by Jan Chen and Lane Nakamura.

On October 12, 2011, Walter Meego's end was officially announced via the group's Twitter account.

Discography 
Albums
Voyager (Sony/Almost Gold Recordings, 2008)
Wondervalley 2010

EPs
Walter Meego EP (Self Released, 2005)
Romantic EP (Brilliante Records, 2007)
"Through a Keyhole Tour EP (Almost Gold Recordings, 2007)

Singles
"Usually" (Single - Self Released, 2005)
"Hollywood / Through a Keyhole" (Double Single - Brilliante Records, 2006)
"Through a Keyhole" (UK Only Single - Minds on Fire Records, 2007)

Compilations
Music for Robots Vol. 2 (2006)
Insound.com SXSW 2007 (2007)

Other
Make it High Mixtape (2006) [not pictured above]

Related
Paint by Numbers EP (Justin Sconza EP, 2006)

References

External links
Walter Meego Official Website
Walter Meego Facebook Page
Walter Meego YouTube Channel
Brilliante Records Website
BreakThru Radio - Artist of The Week
Review of Voyager at The Donnybrook Writing Academy

Rock music groups from Illinois
Musical groups from Chicago